Janelle, Janell, and Janel  are feminine given names, variant of Jane which  derives from the Greek name Ἰωάννης (Iōannēs), derived from the Hebrew name יוֹחָנָן (Yochanan), meaning "God is merciful".
Other origin of the name is Jennifer, which Janelle can derivate, meaning the "fair one".

People

Janelle
 Janelle Atkinson (born 1982), Jamaican swimmer
 Janelle Billingslea (born 1980s), American runner
 Janelle Casanave (born 1981/82), contestant on The Real World: Key West
 Janelle Commissiong (born 1953), Trinidad-and-Tobago-born beauty contestant
 Janelle Jamer (born 1983), Philippine actress
 Janelle James, American comedian, writer, and actress
 Janelle Johnson (1923-1995), actress
 Janelle Lawson (born 1987), Australian netball player
 Janelle Monáe (born 1985), American musician
 Janelle Patton (1972/73-2002), Australian murder victim
 Janelle Pierzina (born 1980), contestant on the U.S. reality show Big Brother
 Janelle Quintana (born 1989), Philippine actress
 Janelle Redhead (born 1989), Grenadian runner
 Janelle Saffin (born 1954), Australian politician
 Janelle Taylor (born 1944), American author

Janell
 Janell Burse (born 1979), American professional basketball player
 Janell Cannon (born 1957), American children's writer and illustrator
 Janell Moon, American author of spiritual non-fiction and poetry
 Janell Smith (1947–2020), American Olympic sprinter
 Janell Wheeler (born 1985), American musician among American Idol semi-finalists

Janel
 Janel Bishop (born 1970s), beauty queen from Manchester, New Hampshire, who won the 1991 Miss Teen USA title
 Janel Brandtjen, American politician
 Janel Jorgensen (born 1971), former butterfly swimmer from the United States
 Janel McCarville (born 1982), American professional basketball player
 Janel Moloney, American actress
 Janel Parrish (born 1988), American actress

English feminine given names